Flor Silvestre is a studio album by Mexican singer Flor Silvestre, released in 1959 by Musart Records. It is Flor Silvestre's first Musart album and contains the hit singles she recorded for the label in the late 1950s.

The album was reissued several times in its original LP format. In 2008, an abridged version of the album, Laguna de pesares, was released digitally.

Background
This is Flor Silvestre's first studio album for Musart. Flor had only recorded singles and tracks for soundtrack albums prior to the release of this album.

According to the liner notes, Musart took "great care in choosing songs that are most appropriate for the style and tessitura of such a unique singer [Flor Silvestre]".

Track listing
Side one

Side two

Personnel
 Mariachi México – accompaniment
 Mariachi Zapopan – accompaniment

References

External links
 Flor Silvestre at AllMusic

1959 albums
Flor Silvestre albums
Musart Records albums
Spanish-language albums